Radian, in comics, may refer to:

 Radian (Morituri), a Marvel Comics character from Strikeforce Morituri
 Radian, a Marvel Comics character from New X-Men
 Radian, a Marvel Comics character from Doom 2099

See also
Radian (disambiguation)

References